is a 2016 Japanese anime film based on the Yu-Gi-Oh! franchise. The film was released in Japan on April 23, 2016, in the U.S and Canada on January 27, 2017, and in Australia on February 2, 2017.

The Dark Side of Dimensions tells a new story by Kazuki Takahashi that takes place six months after the end of the original manga (or one year after the events of the anime in the dub). It introduces a new game mechanic called "Dimension Summon", which bypasses the need for Tributes in Summoning a Higher Level monster, but with the trade-off of receiving its attack or defense value as damage if it is destroyed.

Plot
As the story begins, KaibaCorp is doing research on the Millennium Puzzle. Suddenly, a mysterious cloaked man is seen at the underground shrine as one of Seto Kaiba's bodyguards tells him that he is behind schedule and to speed up his progress. Six months after the departure of the Pharaoh ("one year" in the dub version), Yugi Muto and his closest friends are preparing to graduate Domino High School and are talking about what they will do in the future.

Meanwhile, Seto Kaiba has commissioned an excavation to retrieve the disassembled Millennium Puzzle from the ruins of the Millennium chamber. The item had previously housed the spirit of his longtime rival, Pharaoh Atem who is an Egyptian version of Yugi, from Egyptian times whom he hopes to "return to life" in order to settle their ancient score. The excavation is interrupted by Diva, who faces Kaiba in a game of Duel Monsters and steals two pieces of the recovered Puzzle. He keeps one fragment and gives the other to his younger sister Sera, who passes it on to Yugi Muto, as he is the only one who can reassemble the Puzzle, being the modern-day alternate version of Pharaoh Atem.

Diva, under the alias "Aigami," forges a "friendship" with Yugi and the rest of his friends. He takes interest in Yugi's friend Ryo Bakura, whom he believes is responsible for the death of his father-like mentor, Shadi. Using his Quantum Cube, he transports Bakura and Joey Wheeler to another dimension. Bakura apologizes and explains that the evil spirit of the Millennium Ring had been responsible. The two are interrupted by Mani, who has become warped by the evil energies of the Millennium Ring. When Yugi, Téa Gardner, and Tristan Taylor find "Aigami", Aigami reveals himself to be Diva, and his plan to eliminate Bakura as well as Yugi. As Diva almost disintegrates the three of them into another dimension, Joey unknowingly returns to the real world, with help of Pharaoh Atem.

Meanwhile as Seto Kaiba has a computer that rebuilds the Millennium Puzzle and discovers the last two pieces are missing. He abducts Diva and approaches Yugi, so he can have the two take part in the showcasing of his updated Duel Disk virtual reality technology. He intends to duel both Diva and Yugi, while gambling their pieces of the puzzle. However, Yugi is furious with Diva over what he has done to Bakura and insists he will duel him instead, which Kaiba agrees to.

Yugi defeats Diva, resulting in Bakura's return to reality, and while dueling Kaiba, Yugi re-completes the Millennium Puzzle to demonstrate that the spirit of Atem is no longer inside it. Diva becomes corrupted by the incredible evil powers of the Millennium Ring, and duels both Yugi and Kaiba. Kaiba sacrifices himself during the Duel and makes a final plea for Yugi to call forth Atem. Yugi puts on the puzzle and continues the Duel. Towards the end, Yugi's body reaches its limits and he finds himself incapable of drawing his next card. He weakly stating that he believes in the heart of the cards in and begins to black out, but is suddenly engulfed in a beam of golden light. Pharaoh Atem, dressed in the Domino High School uniform, possesses Yugi's body once again, thanks to the recompletion of the Millennium Puzzle and becomes a hero again. Without speaking, Atem Summons "Palladium Oracle Mahad", who kneels before him. "Mahad" then defeats Diva, whose body reverts to normal, before disappearing. Atem and Yugi separate into two bodies and Atem and the Millennium Puzzle then fade away, and Kaiba and everyone else return to reality.

The story concludes with Yugi and friends graduating. The party sees Tēa off at the airport as she goes off to pursue her lifelong dream of becoming a professional dancer in New York City. Meanwhile Kaiba uses his technology in conjunction with the Quantum Cube to transport his own consciousness to the Afterlife. He challenges Pharaoh Atem, sitting on his throne, who responds with a confident smile as the film ends.

Voice Cast

Production
The film was announced in the West prior to its announcement in Japan. 4K Media Inc. announced the film on the official Yu-Gi-Oh! website, that the movie was in development in Japan and that they were shopping for a distributor in all non-Asian territories. The film's teaser trailer was first shown in a panel featuring Kazuki Takahashi at San Diego Comic-Con 2015. It was later uploaded to the official yugioh.com YouTube channel. Original Yu-Gi-Oh! manga creator Kazuki Takahashi personally drew the keyframes for one of the film's sequences. 4K Media held a contest in August 2016, offering fans the chance to provide voices for the English-language release of the film.

Release
The film was released in theaters in Japan on April 23, 2016, later receiving 4DX and MX4D screenings on September 24, 2016. Before the release on 2017, to promote the upcoming film, Six Flags theme park began to promote a campaign for the film from November 19, 2016 to January 1, 2017, as 4K Media confirmed to promote for the new holiday promotion in partnership Six Flags Entertainment Corporation. The film received limited screenings in North America from January 27, 2017, to February 9, 2017, offering limited edition trading cards for attendees, while Manga Entertainment screened the film for a limited time in the United Kingdom in February 2017. Eleven Arts later listed the English subtitled version screenings in the United States.

Transcend Game
Yu-Gi-Oh! creator Kazuki Takahashi created a new one-shot manga called TRANSCEND GAME. The two-part prologue story is set between the end of the Yu-Gi-Oh! manga and the beginning of The Dark Side of Dimensions. In Japan, Part 1 was released in the 19th issue of Weekly Shōnen Jump on April 11, 2016, and Part 2 was released in the 20th issue on April 18, 2016.

In the United States, Part 1 was released in the December 19, 2016 issue of VIZ Media's digital Weekly Shōnen Jump magazine. Part 2 was released in the January 2, 2017 issue.

Reception

Box office 
The Dark Side of Dimensions opened on 137 theaters and debuted at number 6 in the Japanese box office charts, earning 133,010,600 yen (about $1,200,000) in its first weekend. The film earned over 800,000,000 yen (about $7,500,000) after its screenings ended. During its 4DX and MX4D screenings, the film has earned 1,000,000,000 yen (about US $9,000,000). In the United Kingdom the film grossed a total of $141,065 and in Australia $157,175. In New Zealand, the film earned $16,680 on its opening weekend. In the United States, the film earned a total of $1,015,339.

Home media 
In the United Kingdom, it was 2017's seventh best-selling foreign language film on home video, and the year's third best-selling Japanese film (behind the anime films Your Name and My Neighbor Totoro).

Critical response
The Dark Side of Dimensions received a mixed critical reception. On review aggregator Rotten Tomatoes, the film has an approval rating of 40%, with an average rating of 5.1/10 from five critic reviews. Richard Eisenbeis from Kotaku reviewed the movie favorably, praising the character conflict and narrative. However, S. Jhoanna Robledo from Common Sense Media notes that the complicated storyline is best appreciated by fans of the show.

Home media
The film was released on DVD and Blu-ray on March 8, 2017, in Japan. The Yu-Gi-Oh! Transcend Game manga was bundled with the release. Manga Entertainment released the film on Blu-ray Disc and DVD on May 29, 2017, in the United Kingdom. Lionsgate released the film on Blu-ray Disc, DVD, and Digital HD on June 27, 2017, in the United States and Canada. Anchor Bay Entertainment also released the film on June 13, 2017.

References

External links
 yugioh20th.com Yu-Gi-Oh! The Dark Side of Dimensions (Japanese)
 
 

2016 anime films
Yu-Gi-Oh!-related anime
2016 films
Anime films based on manga
Toei Company films
Films scored by Yoshihiro Ike
Films scored by Shinkichi Mitsumune